Rama Varma X (died January 1809) was an Indian monarch who ruled the Kingdom of Cochin from 1805 to 1809.

Family 

Rama Varma was the son of Sakthan Thampuran's mother's younger sister (famously known as Chittamma Thampuran) and therefore his cousin. He succeeded the Sakthan Thampuran on the latter's death in 1805

Reign 

Rama Varma is generally remembered as a generous, mild-mannered person and an incapable monarch. 

Rama Varma was an excellent writer and authored the Sundarakanda Purana.

Death 

Rama Varma died at Vellarapilly in January 1809.

References 
 

1809 deaths
Rulers of Cochin
Year of birth unknown